Bata, Baťa, Baţa, Batá or BATA may refer to:

Organizations
 Bata Corporation, a multinational corporation
 Bata Shoe Museum, a museum of the history of footwear in Toronto
 Bay Area Toll Authority, the bridge toll administrator of the San Francisco Bay Area

Places
 Bata, Equatorial Guinea, the largest city in Equatorial Guinea
 Bata (village), a village in the municipality of Pomorie, Burgas Province, Bulgaria
 Bata, Arad, a commune in Arad County, Romania
 Baţa, a village in Petru Rareş Commune, Bistrița-Năsăud County, Romania
 Bata, Burgas Province, a place in Burgas Province, Bulgaria
 Baťa Canal, a canal in the Czech Republic
 Bata, Pazardzhik Province, a village in Bulgaria
 Bata, the Greek and Genoese colony in Russia that became Novorossiysk
 Bata Airport, an airport in Equatorial Guinea
 Báta, a village in Hungary

People
 Bata (name)

Other uses
 4318 Baťa, asteroid named after the shoe company family
 Bata, the cyprinid fish Labeo bata
 Batá drum, a double-headed (traditional Yoruba) drum shaped like an hourglass with one cone larger than the other
 Bata (god), an Egyptian bull-god of the New Kingdom
 Bata (martial arts), a term used in Irish martial arts traditionally applied to various forms of stick fighting
 Bata people, people of North Province, Cameroon
 Bata (tribe), a tribe in Bhawana, Pakistan

See also
Beta (disambiguation)